Cándida is a 1939  Argentine musical film drama directed by Luis Bayon Herrera. The tango film premiered in Buenos Aires and starred Juan Carlos Thorry.

Plot 
Cándida Villar is a clumsy Galician maid who speaks improperly, get a lot of troubles in all the conversations with her bosses, simple and straightforward who from night to morning becomes the most lucky woman of the word because she met a hilarious gallery of character in an art gallery.

Cast
 Niní Marshall ...  Cándida 
 Augusto Codecá ...  Jesús 
 Juan Carlos Thorry ...  Dr. Adolfo Sánchez 
 Tulia Ciámpoli ...  Esther 
 César Fiaschi ...  Dr. Luis Giménez 
 Adolfo Stray ...  Jacobo 
 Nélida Bilbao ...  La dactilógrafa 
 Lita Fernand ...  Julia 
 Chiche Gicovatte ...  Julia 
 Cielito ...  Pepito 
 S. Tortorelli ...  Pepito 
 L.S. Pereyra ...  Augustito 
 Pedro González ...  El médico 
 Armando Durán ...  Agenciero 
 A. Porzio ...  El patotero

References

External links

1939 films
1930s Spanish-language films
Argentine black-and-white films
Tango films
Films directed by Luis Bayón Herrera
1930s musical drama films
Argentine musical drama films
1939 drama films
1930s Argentine films